Roland Charmy (12 January 1908 in Paris – 1987) was a French classical violinist and academic of the Conservatoire de Paris.

He was the son of the homonymous writer (1885–1959), whose real name was Charles Touchet.

He was a teacher of Patrick Bismuth. In 1936, he married the celebrated harpist Lily Laskine. They are both buried, along with Roland Charmy Sr., at the Saint-Ouen Cemetery.

References

External links 

1908 births
1987 deaths
Musicians from Paris
20th-century French male classical violinists
Academic staff of the Conservatoire de Paris
Burials at Saint-Ouen Cemetery